Netechma moderata is a species of moth of the family Tortricidae. It is found in Brazil's Federal District.

References

External links
 

Moths described in 2001
Netechma